

Headline Event of the Year
Chicago White Sox players accused of throwing World Series, resulting in the Black Sox scandal.

Champions
World Series: Cincinnati Reds over Chicago White Sox (5–3)

Awards and honors
MLB Most Valuable Player Award
 None

MLB statistical leaders

Major league baseball final standings

American League final standings

National League final standings

Events

January
January 26 – After the city of Pasadena, California passed an ordinance requiring all people to wear masks in public due to the Spanish flu pandemic, a California Winter League game took place between the Pasadena and La Habra teams in which all players and umpires wore masks.
January 30 – The Cincinnati Reds hire Pat Moran as manager when no word is received from manager Christy Mathewson, who is still in France.
January 31 – Future Hall of Fame member Jackie Robinson is born to Jerry and Mallie Robinson in Cairo, Georgia.

February
February 1 – After winning an out-of-court settlement of his suit against the Brooklyn Robins for the balance of his salary ($2,150) when the 1918 season ended a month early, former MVP Jake Daubert is traded to the Reds for OF Tommy Griffith.
February 5 – Charges brought in 1918 by Reds owner Garry Herrmann and manager Christy Mathewson against Hal Chase for betting against his team and throwing games in collusion with gamblers are dismissed by National League president John Heydler.
February 19 - The Reds trade Chase to the New York Giants in exchange for first baseman Walter Holke and catcher Bill Rariden. 
February 21 – The New York Yankees acquire 35-year-old spitballer Jack Quinn from Vernon (PCL), sending in exchange P Happy Finneran, 1B Zinn Beck, and cash. Quinn will be named a designated spitballer when the wet pitch is outlawed, and in 1921 he will help the Yankees to their first American League pennant. Quinn won't call it quits until he's 50.
February 28 - The St, Louis Browns purchase the contract of catcher Wally Mayer from the Boston Red Sox for the sum of $5,000.

March
March 1 – Philadelphia Athletics owner Connie Mack makes one of his biggest player mistakes, trading 3B Larry Gardner, OF Charlie Jamieson, and P Elmer Myers to Cleveland in exchange for OF Braggo Roth. Vet writer Ernest Lanigan predicts that Roth will lead the circuit in homers at Shibe Park, but Roth will be shipped on to Boston by midseason. Gardner will put in six more .300 years, and Jamieson will be a top leadoff man and .303 hitter for the next 14 years.
March 7 – Christy Mathewson, back from World War I, rejoins the Giants as pitching coach and heir apparent to John McGraw.
March 17 – The Boston Red Sox, minus holdouts Carl Mays and Babe Ruth, sail from New York aboard the S.S. Arapahoe. The trip to spring training is stormy and most of the players will be seasick.

April
April 18 - The Brooklyn Robins purchase the contract of outfielder Lee Magee from the Cincinnati Reds. Magee would later be a key figure in Hal Chase's banishment from baseball when Magee confided to National League president John Heydler that Chase tried to bribe him to not hustle in a game.
April 19 – Pushed through the legislature by future New York City mayor Jimmy Walker, a bill legalizing Sunday baseball in the state is signed by Governor Al Smith.
April 25- Dickey Kerr makes his major league debut for the Chicago White Sox. He relieved starter Dave Danforth and pitched seven innings in a 7-2 loss to the St. Louis Browns. Kerr did not figure in the decision.

May
May 4 –  The New York Giants play their first legal Sunday game at home, before 35,000 fans, losing to the Philadelphia Phillies, 4–3. More than 25,000 turn out in Brooklyn the same day. By early June, the Giants will outdraw their 1918 attendance.
May 6- A 24 year old outfielder named George Halas makes his MLB debut for the New York Yankees. He goes one for four in a game against the Philadelphia Athletics. This would be the only season Halas plays in the majors before he became one of the founders of the National Football League.  
May 11:
Cincinnati Reds right-hander Hod Eller pitches a 6–0 no-hitter over the St. Louis Cardinals.
Walter Johnson retires 28 consecutive batters during a 12-inning scoreless tie against Jack Quinn and the New York Yankees. Future football immortal George Halas, batting leadoff for New York, goes 0-for-5 with two strikeouts.
May 15 –  The Cincinnati Reds bomb Al Mamaux for 10 runs in the 13th innings to beat the Brooklyn Robins, 10–0. Reds RF Greassy Neale has a record 10 putouts.
May 20 – Red Sox pitcher Babe Ruth hit his first career grand slam home run; the bomb comes against Dave Davenport of the St. Louis Browns in St. Louis. Boston wins 6–4.
May 21 –  The Giants send Jim Thorpe to Boston for the $1,500 waiver price.
May 23 –  It's Hank Gowdy Day in Boston, the catcher's first game after returning from the Army. He hits the first pitch he sees for a single.

June
June 14 –  Chicago White Sox ace Eddie Cicotte beats the Philadelphia Athletics for the 12th straight time en route to a 29–7 record and a 1.82 ERA.
 The New York Giants sign free agent infielder Frankie Frisch. Without spending a day in the minor leagues, Frisch, who'd just graduated from Fordham, makes his MLB three days later versus Chicago.
June 23:
Boston Red Sox 1B Stuffy McInnis makes his first error of the year after handling 526 chances.
Chicago White Sox CF Happy Felsch handles a record-tying 12 chances in a nine-inning game. Only Harry Bay of Cleveland in 1904 has been so busy.

July
July 1 – Going 5-for-5 in a 9–4 win over the Phillies, Brooklyn's Ed Konetchy gets his 10th straight hit, tying Jake Gettman's record set with Washington in 1897. Both will be topped by Walt Dropo in 1952.
July 6 – William Veeck, former sportswriter, replaces Fred Mitchell as Chicago Cubs president, but Mitchell remains as  manager for the team.
July 8 – Jack Coombs resigns as manager of the last-place Philadelphia Phillies. Slugger Gavvy Cravath replaces him.
July 29 - The New York Yankees trade pitchers Bob McGraw and Allen Russell to the Boston Red Sox for a player to be named later. The trade is completed the next day when the Red Sox ship pitcher Carl Mays to the Yankees.

August
August 8 – The Pittsburgh Pirates trade Casey Stengel to the Phillies for Possum Whitted, who will bat .389 for Pittsburgh in the last 35 games of the season.
August 11 – Cleveland's Tris Speaker ties an AL record, scoring five runs in a 15–9 win at New York.
August 14:
Babe Ruth hits his 17th home run, the first of seven homers in 12 days, which will include his fourth grand slam, setting an AL record until 1959. The Yankees overcome Muddy Ruel's hitting into a triple play and beat the Tigers in 15 innings, 5–4.
Chicago White Sox CF Happy Felsch ties the major-league record with four OF assists in one game, but the Boston Red Sox beats Chicago 15–6.
The Brooklyn Robins waste no time in splitting a pair with the Chicago Cubs, losing 2–0 in an hour and 10 minutes, then winning 1–0 in one hour and seven minutes in the second game.
August 16 –  The St. Louis Browns set an AL record with 53 total chances against the Philadelphia Athletics, but lose 7–4. The Browns have 26 assists and St. Louis 1B George Sisler has 17 putouts. With no putouts, the St. Louis outfielders have the day off.
August 20:
 Wichita OF Joe Wilhoit (Western League) fails to get a hit, ending a 69-game streak in which he collected 155 hits in 299 at bats for a .505 batting average. The previous record was 49 by Oakland's Jack Ness (Pacific Coast League) in 1915.
 The New York Yankees purchase the contracts of outfielder Bob Meusel from Vernon of the PCL, and pitcher Rip Collins from Dallas in the Texas League. Both players would play key roles in the Yankees' 1921 AL Pennant team.
August 24 –  Cleveland Indians P Ray Caldwell is flattened by a bolt of lightning in his debut with the team. He recovers to get the final out of the game, and defeats the Philadelphia Athletics 2–1.
August 26 – New York Giants 1B Hal Chase handles 35 chances against the Pittsburgh Pirates during a doubleheader.
August 28- Bucky Harris makes his MLB debut for the Washington Senators, playing second base. Harris would eventually make the hall of fame as a manager.

September
September 2 – The National Commission recommends a best-of-nine World Series games. The lengthier World Series is seen as a sign of greed and is abandoned after three years.
September 8 – Babe Ruth hits his 26th home run off Jack Quinn at the Polo Grounds, breaking the 25-HR record set by Buck Freeman in 1899.
September 10 – Cleveland Indians' pitcher Ray Caldwell, struck by lightning 2 weeks earlier, no-hits his former teammates New York Yankees 3–0 at the Polo Grounds.
September 16 – Dutch Ruether beats the New York Giants, 4–3, to clinch the Cincinnati Reds first pennant since 1882, during their American Association days.
September 20 – Babe Ruth ties Ned Williamson's major-league home run mark of 27 with a game-winner off Lefty Williams of the Chicago White Sox. Four days later, Ruth will hit his 28 over the roof of the Polo Grounds.
September 21 –  The Cubs beat the Braves 3–0 in 58 minutes of playing time. It takes the Robins 55 minutes to beat the Reds 3–1. Slim Sallee throws 65 pitches, topping Christy Mathewson's 69-pitch complete game. One week later the Giants will close the season beating the Phillies, 6–1, to set a record 51 minutes.
September 24:
The Chicago White Sox' 6–5 win over the St. Louis Browns clinches the AL pennant; the final margin will be 3½ games over the Cleveland Indians.
The Brooklyn Robins defeat the Phillies twice on Fred Luderus Day in Philadelphia. The second game is the 528th in a row played by the Phillies 1B, who is presented with a diamond stickpin and gold watch between games to commemorate his endurance effort. He will end the season with a consecutive-game streak of 533.
Boston Red Sox pitcher Waite Hoyt throws nine perfect innings against the New York Yankees, but they come in the 13th in which he gives up hits to lose 2–1.
September 27 – Babe Ruth hit his 29th home run and his first of the year in Washington, to become the first player to hit at least one home run in every AL park in the same season.
September 28 – On the last day of the season, Jesse Barnes won his National League-leading 25th victory, 6–1, over Lee Meadows and the Philadelphia Phillies at Polo Grounds. The game was played at a feverish pace and lasted a mere 51 minutes, a major league record that still stands as the shortest nine-inning game ever played.

October
October 1 – Just before the start of the World Series, the highly favored Chicago White Sox became the betting underdogs. A year later the White Sox will become the Black Sox, and eight of them: pitchers Eddie Cicotte and Lefty Williams, outfielders Shoeless Joe Jackson and Happy Felsch, 1B Chick Gandil, SS Swede Risberg, 3B Buck Weaver, and utility infielder Fred McMullin, will be barred from baseball for taking part in throwing the Series. It will take that long for the story to unfold, as most observers at the time see nothing amiss when the Series opens in Cincinnati.
October 9 – The Cincinnati Reds defeat the Chicago White Sox, 10-5, in Game 8 of the World Series to win their first World Championship, five games to three.  The events of the series are often associated with the Black Sox Scandal, when several members of the Chicago franchise conspired with gamblers to throw World Series games. The 1919 World Series was the last World Series to take place without a Commissioner of Baseball in place. In , the various franchise owners installed Kenesaw Mountain Landis as the first "Commissioner of Baseball."

November
November 10 – Clark Griffith becomes a club owner and president when he joins Philadelphia grain broker William Richardson in buying controlling interest in the Washington Senators for $175,000. Griffith, unable to get financial help from the American League, mortgages his Montana ranch to raise funds.

December
December 10:
The National League votes to ban the spitball's use by all new pitchers. The ban will be formally worked out by the Rules Committee in February.
With the opposition led by New York, Boston, and Chicago owners, the American League directors pass a resolution accusing Ban Johnson of overstepping his duties. They demand that league files be turned over to them and that an auditor review all financial accounts.
December 26 – Although it will not be officially announced until January, the New York Yankees buy Babe Ruth from financially pressed Harry Frazee, paying $125,000 (one-fourth cash, plus $25,000 a year at six percent) plus guaranteeing a $300,000 loan with Fenway Park as collateral.
December 29 – The Boston Red Sox send OF Braggo Roth and 2B Red Shannon to the Washington Senators in exchange for P Harry Harper, OF Mike Menosky and 3B Eddie Foster.

Births

January
January 1 – Sherry Robertson
January 2 – Bill Harman
January 3 – Ed Sauer
January 8 – Don White
January 9 – Charlie Sproull
January 11 – Lou Rochelli
January 13 – Ben Guintini
January 22 – Diomedes Olivo
January 29 – Hank Edwards
January 29 – Bill Voiselle
January 31 – Ken Gables
January 31 – Jackie Robinson

February
February 1 – Norm Brown
February 5 – Cy Buker
February 5 – Bill Burgo
February 7 – Stan Galle
February 13 – Bobby Rhawn
February 15 – Ducky Detweiler
February 22 – Johnny Lucadello
February 24 – Del Wilber
February 25 – Monte Irvin

March
March 3 – Bud Souchock
March 4 – Les Mueller
March 5 – Don Savage
March 7 – Junior Walsh
March 15 – Ray Noble
March 15 – Whitey Wietelmann
March 16 – Tom Gorman
March 17 – Pete Reiser
March 18 – Mickey Rutner
March 18 – Hal White
March 25 – Bill Evans
March 28 – Vic Raschi
March 30 – Bud Sketchley

April
April 2 – Earl Johnson
April 3 – Larry Shepard
April 11 – Hank Schenz
April 18 – Bob Ferguson
April 20 – Earl Harrist
April 21 – Stan Rojek
April 28 – Charlie Metro

May
May 1 – Al Zarilla
May 4 – Cy Block
May 9 – Carl Lindquist
May 11 – Porter Vaughan
May 13 – Bill Kinnamon
May 15 – Ed Wright
May 16 – Stubby Overmire
May 16 – Lefty Phillips
May 19 – Earl Naylor
May 20 – Harry Taylor
May 24 – Jack Phillips
May 28 – Art Lopatka
May 28 – Steve Nagy
May 29 – Al Brancato

June
June 8 – Dee Phillips
June 8 – Charley Schanz
June 11 – Earl Jones
June 20 – Bill Clemensen

July
July 6 – Hardin Cathey
July 7 – Hugh East
July 8 – Charlie Gilbert
July 9 – Lillian Luckey
July 10 – Dain Clay
July 10 – Daisy Junor
July 12 – Johnny Wyrostek
July 14 –  Crash Davis
July 16 – Art Johnson
July 16 – Tommy Tatum
July 17 – Hal Erickson
July 23 – Strick Shofner

August
August 4 – Lillian Jackson
August 5 – Buddy Gremp
August 6 – Leon Culberson
August 6 – Bobby Sturgeon
August 9 – Ralph Houk
August 9 – Fred Sanford
August 11 – Luis Rodríguez Olmo
August 12 – Fred Hutchinson
August 15 – Ted Pawelek
August 16 – Alcibíades Colón
August 17 – Clem Hausmann
August 17 – Ernie Nevel
August 21 – Dalmiro Finol, Venezuelan baseball player (d. 1994)
August 22 – Ed Freed
August 22 – Hank LaManna
August 28 – Chip Marshall
August 29 – Billy Cox
August 29 – Orval Grove
August 31 – Jack Wallaesa

September
September 1 – Gladys Davis
September 1 – Jim Hopper
September 4 – Eddie Waitkus
September 5 – Ray Goolsby
September 5 – Tom Jordan
September 8 – Jimmie Armstead
September 11 – Barney Olsen
September 15 – Mike Budnick
September 16 – Bruce Konopka
September 16 – Penny O'Brian
September 27 – Bill Ayers
September 27 – Johnny Pesky
September 29 – Slim Emmerich

October
October 1 – Bob Boyd
October 1 – Barney Mussill
October 2 – Joe Buzas
October 3 – Joe Wood
October 7 – Tommy Hughes
October 8 – Bob Gillespie
October 16 – Ed Bahr
October 17 – Charlie Cozart
October 17 – Howie Moss
October 18 – Lee Pfund
October 19 – Jack Niemes
October 20 – Jack Franklin
October 26 – Jack Cassini
October 27 – Don Richmond

November
November 2 – Bill Mills
November 3 – Spider Jorgensen
November 6 – Frank Carswell
November 7 – Tommy Neill
November 9 – Jerry Priddy
November 10 – Harry Feldman
November 11 – Glenn Elliott
November 15 – Bill Burgo
November 17 – Ray Lamanno
November 20 – Rugger Ardizoia
November 24 – Napoleón Reyes
November 26 – Danny Reynolds

December
December 1 – Pete Wojey
December 3 – Hooks Iott
December 3 – James Tillman
December 5 – Baby Ortiz
December 10 – Irene Kotowicz
December 10 – Andy Tomasic
December 11 – Merl Combs
December 15 – Ken Trinkle
December 17 – Johnny Kucab
December 26 – Gene Markland
December 30 – Pete Layden
December 31 – Tommy Byrne
December 31 – Loyd Christopher

Deaths

January–February
January 1 – Gene Curtis, 35, outfielder for the 1903 Pittsburgh Pirates.
January 3 – Al Schellhase, 54, outfielder for the 1890 Boston Beaneaters (NL) and the 1891 Louisville Colonels (AA).
January 3 – Art Rico, 23, Italian-born catcher who played from 1916 through 1917 for the Boston Braves of the National League.
January 6 – Jake Stenzel, 51, National League center fielder for four different clubs between 1890 and 1899, a five-time .300 hitter whose career batting average of .339 is the 12th highest in Major League history.
January 8 – Jim O'Rourke, 68, left fielder for Boston, Buffalo and New York who batted .314 lifetime and ended his career ranked second all-time in games, hits, runs, doubles and total bases; made first hit in major league history after four seasons in National Association, and later became oldest player ever to get a hit at age 54; led NL in hits, runs, home runs, triples and walks once each; later a minor league manager and executive.
January 23 – John Newell, 51, third baseman who played for the Pittsburgh Pirates during the 1891 season.
February 7 – Lefty Davis, 44, outfielder who hit .261 in 348 games with the Pirates, Highlanders, Reds and Superbas between 1901 and 1907.

March–April
March 1 – Bill Fouser, 63, second baseman for the 1876 Philadelphia Athletics.
March 1 – Hal McClure, 59, outfielder for the 1882 Boston Red Caps of the National League.
March 5 – Bill Yawkey, 44, owner of the Detroit Tigers from 1903 through 1919, victim of the 1918 flu pandemic.
March 6 – Fred Demarais, 52, Canadian pitcher for the 1890 Chicago Colts of the National League.
March 7 – Phil Auten, 79, co-owner of the Pittsburgh Pirates from 1893 to 1900.
March 13 – Jim Toy, 60, played two seasons, 1887 & 1890, sometimes credited at the first Native American to play in the Majors.
 March 30 – John Bates, 50, pitcher for the 1889 Kansas City Cowboys of the American Association.
March 28 – Steve Toole, 59, pitcher for the Kansas City Cowboys and the Brooklyn Grays/Gladiators teams between 1886 and 1890.
April 25 – Bill Higgins, 59, second baseman who played with the Boston Beaneaters of the National League (1888) and the St. Louis Browns and Syracuse Stars of the American Association (1890).
April 28 – Bill Ahearn, 61, catcher who played in one game for the Troy Trojans of the National League in 1880.

May–June
May 16 – Germany Schaefer, 42, second baseman who forced a rule change after stealing first base in reverse direction during a 1908 game while with the Tigers.
May 26 – Sadie Houck, 63, shortstop who played eight seasons from 1879 to 1887.
May 28 – Jack Wanner, 33, shortstop for the 1909 New York Highlanders of the American League.
June 5 – John McCloskey, 36, pitcher who played from 1906 to 1907 for the Philadelphia Phillies.
June 15 – Fred Tenney, 59, Union Association outfielder who played for the Washington Nationals, Boston Reds and Wilmington Quicksteps in the 1884 baseball season.
June 20 – William Stephen Devery, 65, former New York City police commissioner who, with Frank J. Farrell, bought the original Baltimore Orioles of the American League in 1902, moved them to New York as the Highlanders in 1903, and sold them (as the New York Yankees) to Jacob Ruppert and Tillinghast L'Hommedieu Huston in 1915.
June 22 – Joe Woerlin, 54, French shortstop who played in one game for the 1895 Washington Senators of the National League.
June 27 – Larry Schlafly, 40, second baseman and manager for the Buffalo Buffeds/Blues of the Federal League.

July–August
July 9 – Aleck Smith, 35, backup catcher for four different teams during nine seasons, and a member of the 1903 American League champions Boston Americans.
July 24 – Ed Bagley, 55, pitcher for the 1884 New York Gothams and the 1885 New York Metropolitans.
August 11 – Frank Todd, 49, pitcher for the 1898 Louisville Colonels of the American Association.
August 16 – Ed McKean, 55, shortstop for the Cleveland Spiders who batted .302 lifetime and had four seasons of 100 runs and 100 RBI; among first ten players to reach 2000 hits.
August 21 – Bob Clark, 56, catcher for the Brooklyn Grays/Bridegrooms, Cincinnati Reds and Louisville Colonels between 1886 and 1893.

September–October
September 8 – John Kerins, 52, first baseman/catcher and two time manager from 1884 to 1890.
September 20 – Cy Seymour, 46, center fielder for the Giants and Reds who batted .303 lifetime; led NL in batting, doubles, triples and RBI in 1905, also won 61 games as pitcher from 1896–1900.
September 22 – Harry Sullivan, 31, pitcher for the 1909 St. Louis Cardinals.
October 14 – Harry Blake, 45, outfielder who played from 1894 through 1899 for the Cleveland Spiders (AA) and the St. Louis Perfectos (NL).
October 30 – Bill Lattimore, 35, pitcher for the 1908 Cleveland Naps of the American League.

November–December
November 14 – Vince Dailey, 54, outfielder for the 1890 Cleveland Spiders of the National League.
November 25 – Grover Gilmore, 31, outfielder who played from 1914 to 1915 with the Kansas City Packers of the Federal League.
December 4 – Joe Peitz, 50, right fielder for the 1894 St. Louis Browns of the National League.
December 10 – Tom Colcolough, 49, pitcher for the Pittsburgh Pirates and New York Giants between 1893 and 1899.
December 27 – Jerry Hurley, 44, catcher for the 1901 Cincinnati Reds and the 1907 Brooklyn Superbas.
December 30 – Garnet Bush, 37, Umpire in the National League and the Federal League.

References